John O'Dell Morgan (February 14, 1900 – March 3, 1962) was an American football player and coach of football, basketball and baseball.  He served as the head football coach at Texas Tech University from 1941 to 1950, compiling a record of 55–49–3. Morgan was also the head basketball coach at Texas Tech from 1931 to 1934, tallying a mark of 42–29.  In addition, he was the head baseball coach at Auburn University from 1934 to 1939 and at Rice University from 1953 to 1961, amassing a career college baseball coaching record of 146–143–2.

Coaching career
Morgan was the head coach of the Texas Tech Red Raiders basketball from 1931 to 1934. During the same time, Morgan also served as an assistant coach to the football team. His record during that time was 42–29.  Morgan was later the head coach of the Texas Tech Red Raiders football team from 1941 to 1950. During his tenure, he compiled a 55–49–3 record. In four of his last five seasons, he posted a winning record. His best season came in 1941, when his team went 9–2.

Death
Morgan was killed in car accident near Bay City, Texas on March 3, 1962.

Head coaching record

Football

References

1900 births
1962 deaths
American men's basketball coaches
American football tackles
Auburn Tigers baseball coaches
Auburn Tigers football coaches
Austin Kangaroos baseball coaches
Austin Kangaroos football coaches
Austin Kangaroos football players
Basketball coaches from Texas
Rice Owls baseball coaches
Rice Owls football coaches
Texas Tech Red Raiders football coaches
Texas Tech Red Raiders basketball coaches
People from Weatherford, Texas
Road incident deaths in Texas